An-Li Kachelhoffer (née Pretorius; born 16 August 1987) is a South African former road cyclist. She participated at the 2014 UCI Road World Championships. In 2016, she won the South African National Road Race Championships. She represented South Africa at the 2016 Summer Olympics in the women's road race in which she finished 39th with a time of 4:01:29.

Major results

2007
 9th 947 Cycle Challenge
2009
 9th 947 Cycle Challenge
2010
 9th 947 Cycle Challenge
2011
 8th Road race, Summer Universiade
2012
 African Road Championships
2nd  Time trial
2nd  Road race
 3rd Time trial, National Road Championships
2013
 3rd Road race, National Road Championships
 African Road Championships
4th Road race
5th Time trial
2014
 6th 947 Cycle Challenge
2015
 African Road Championships
1st  Team time trial
4th Road race
 2nd Road race, National Road Championships
 KZN Autumn Series
2nd Freedom Day Classic
3rd Hibiscus Cycle Classic
 8th Overall Tour Cycliste Féminin International de l'Ardèche
1st Stage 6
 8th 947 Cycle Challenge
2016
 African Road Championships
1st  Team time trial
2nd  Road race
 1st  Road race, National Road Championships
2017
 2nd Road race, National Road Championships
 8th Road race, African Road Championships

References

External links
 
 
 
 
 
 
 

1987 births
Living people
South African female cyclists
Olympic cyclists of South Africa
Cyclists at the 2016 Summer Olympics
Afrikaner people
Sportspeople from Pretoria
21st-century South African women